Cinderella of the Hills is a lost 1921 silent drama film directed by Howard M. Mitchell and starring Barbara Bedford and Barbara La Marr. It was produced and distributed by Fox Film Corporation.

Cast
Barbara Bedford - Norris Gradley
Carl Miller - Claude Wolcott
Cecil Van Auker - Rodney Bates
Clarence Wilson - Peter Poff
Tom McGuire - Giles
Barbara La Marr - Kate Gradley (as Barbara La Marr Deely)

References

External links

1921 films
Lost American films
Films directed by Howard M. Mitchell
Fox Film films
American silent feature films
American black-and-white films
Films based on American novels
1920s American films